Korean April 26 Animation Studio is a state-owned North Korean animation studio, based in Ot'an-dong, Central District, Pyongyang.

History
The studio started operations in September 1957, as 4.26 Children's Film Studio (4.26아동영화촬영소). 

SEK Studio worked with foreign animators and companies with relative frequency for a North Korean operation throughout the 1980s, 1990s and 2000s. Around 1985, it began to outsource animation for European television It has also done subcontracting work on over 250 foreign animations. They mainly worked on subcontracting Russian, Italian, French, Spanish and Chinese animation, with American animation being outsourced in an indirect way.

SEK has done work on several animated series with Mondo TV, including Pocahontas: Princess of the American Indians and Simba the King Lion, (due to these two, it has been repeatedly misinformed that SEK has worked for The Walt Disney Company). SEK also has produced features such as the French science fiction epic Gandahar (The Light Years) and Empress Chung.

It was registered as the SEK Studio which stands for Scientific Educational Korea in 1997 in order to take part at an animation festival in France.

According to Cinemaweb, "The Simpsons Movie was the most prominent US project that SEK helped with", while other "projects" the studio was involved with were "Futurama: Bender's Big Score and even an episode of Avatar: The Last Airbender." According to the Korean Film Council, SEK Studio outsourced episode 72 of Teenage Mutant Ninja Turtles (2003 TV series).

Recently, international collaborations between SEK Studio and other nations has declined significantly, with only China co-producing content. This can largely be attributed to rising tensions between North Korea and the Western Community, notably the United States. SEK Studio participated in "Shijiazhuang International Animation Exhibition" on September 30, 2014. SEK Studio is expected to introduce a new science fiction genre animation. Since 2010s, SEK studio has contracted with many animation studios in China and outsourced in Chinese TV series, web animations, game graphics and commercials. SEK is currently pursuing large-scale projects with Chinese animation companies. It relates to web animated series that will be produced in China.

According to The Pyongyang Times, the studio helps children develop judgement, thinking and reasoning skills, and the studio contributes to the intellectual and ideological education of the people, rejecting the creation of cartoons for purely amusement.

In December 2021, the US Treasury accused SEK Studio and companies and individuals related to it, of exploiting North Korean workers to earn foreign currency and avoid sanctions on North Korea.

Previous Names
SEK Studio was founded in 1957 as April 26 Children’s Animation Film Studio.
 Chosun National Film Studio – Puppet Animation Film Research Institute (1957~1959)
 Chosun National Film Studio – Animation Film Studio (1959~1960)
 Chosun National Film Studio – Animation Film Production (1960~1964)
 Chosun Children's Film Studio (1964~1971)
 Chosun Science Education Film Studio – Animation Film Production Team (1971~1980)
 Chosun Science Education Film Studio – Children's Film Production Team (1980~1996)
 Chosun 4.26 Children's Film Studio (1996~2013)
 Korean April 26 Animation Studio (2013~)

SEK Studio today
As of 2003, SEK Studio employed over 1,500 or 1,600 people and subcontracted work for over 70 companies from around the globe, including Europe, South Korea, China, Canada and the United States. After the introduction of advanced equipment, the number of employees was reduced to about 500. There are 11 animation production teams in SEK Studio, 9 production teams are responsible for overseas animations subcontracting, and the 2 production teams produce domestic animations. According to Animation Career Review, SEK is the 85th most influential animation studio of all-time. SEK Studio's staff is mostly from Pyongyang Art Academy, and SEK Studio has established an animation training institute to teach young students.

In 2014, SEK Studio cooperated with Chinese companies to establish an office in Beijing. SEK Studio also invested $70,000 in Chinese companies. Most employees are in their twenties.

Much of the work produced by SEK Studio is considered to be propaganda for North Korean children, with SEK Studio being state-owned and creating animation intended for a young audience.

Filmography
SEK has provided animation for the following works:

Television

SEK Studio has produced over 300 Animations.

Animation services

The list below is a part of the works outsourced by SEK studio.

Film

In popular culture
Canadian animator and cartoonist Guy Delisle documented his experiences whilst working at the SEK Studio in his graphic novel, Pyongyang: A Journey in North Korea. because SEK studio subcontracted the Corto Maltese animation.

See also

 Korean animation
 List of animation studios

References

 US cartoons 'made in North Korea' (archived)

North Korean animation studios
Children's mass media
Mass media in Pyongyang
Entertainment companies established in 1957
1957 establishments in North Korea